Marthen Tao (born 4 March 1979) is an Indonesian footballer who last played for Persiram Raja Ampat in the Indonesia Super League.

Honours

Club honors
Arema Malang
First Division (1): 2004
Copa Indonesia (2): 2005, 2006

References

External links

1979 births
Living people
Indonesian footballers
Indonesian people of Chinese descent
PKT Bontang players
Arema F.C. players
Persmin Minahasa players
Persiram Raja Ampat players
Liga 1 (Indonesia) players
Association football forwards